Valdimar is an Icelandic indie pop band that was established in 2009 as a duo by Valdimar Guðmundsson and Ásgeir Aðalsteinsson, both originating from Keflavik, Iceland.

About
Guðlaugur Guðmundsson, Þorvaldur Halldórsson, Kristinn Evertsson and Högni Þorsteinsson gradually joined in to render it a 6-member band. When performing live, the band is most often supported by a small brass section. Their music builds up from being soft and intimate to a hair-raising, heart-stirring energy, often with all members on stage playing full blast. The sound of their music can be described as an electro indie mix.

History
The band released their debut album Undraland in 2010 with critical acclaim and commercial success. Four singles that were released from the album reached the Top 10, including their biggest hit "Yfirgefinn", one of the most played songs of 2011 in Iceland. They followed Undraland by the album Um stund released in October 2012, and it acclaimed big success as well, and was nominated as the album of the year at the Icelandic Music Awards. The album contained three big radio hits; "Beðið Eftir Skömminni", "Sýn" and "Yfir Borgina". The band released their third album titled Batnar útsýnið in October 2014.

Discography

Albums
 2010 – Undraland
 2012 – Um stund
 2014 – Batnar útsýnið
 2018 – Sitt sýnist hverjum

Singles

 2010 – Hverjum degi nægir sín þjáning
 2011 – Yfirgefinn
 2012 – Yfir borgina
 2012 – Sýn
 2013 – Beðið eftir skömminni
 2014 – Læt það duga
 2014 – Út úr þögninni
 2014 – Ryðgaður dans
 2015 – Læt það duga
 2016 – Slétt og fellt

Personnel
Valdimar Guðmundsson - vocals and trombone
Ásgeir Aðalsteinsson - guitars and programming
Guðlaugur Már Guðmundsson - bass
Þorvaldur Halldórsson - drums and percussion
Kristinn Evertsson - keyboards and synthesizers
Högni Þorsteinsson - guitars

References

External links
http://www.valdimarband.com
http://www.facebook.com/valdimarband

Icelandic indie pop groups
Musical groups established in 2009
Keflavík
Icelandic indie rock groups